Kim Sønderholm (or Kim S. Andersen /  Kim Andersen) is a Danish actor, film producer and radio personality.

By the age of 12, Kim was familiar with the media business. He was started as a weekly co-host at a local radio station in his hometown, Aarhus in Denmark. Already after a few shows he was given his own DJ program each week. At a few occasions Kim also went on-air on the National Danish Radio. During this time, he also starred in several commercials on both radio and television. As the local radio station had to close, he went on to writing for a couple of magazines, both paper and internet based, in most cases film-related. Since then starring in quite a few underground short films before finally being accepted to theaterschool in 1998, where, during his stay, he and a fellow student wrote manuscripts for no less than three feature films.

After graduation in 2001 he moved to Copenhagen, where he was soon offered a minor role in the blockbuster, Klatretøsen (2002) ("Catch That Girl").

In 2004 he produced and starred in the feature film Brutal Incasso (2005) that we wrote back in theatre school. The film has later won the Audience Award for Best Film at The Weekend Of Fear Film Festival in 2006 and nominated for Best Foreign Film at a couple of other film festivals.

In 2006 he directed his first short film Mental Distortion (which was released as part of The Horror Vault (2008)) alongside doing his first feature film as a director Craig (2008). Besides directing both films, he also played the lead character and both films were finished in late 2007.

Filmography
Klatretøsen (2002)
At kende sandheden (2002)
Anja efter Viktor (2003)
Regel nr. 1 (2003)
Til højre ved den gule hund (2003)
Ambulancen (2005)
Dommeren (2005)
Brutal Incasso (2005)
Af banen! (2005)
No Right Turn (2006)
Næste skridt (2006)
Snuppet (2006)
Rovdrift (2006)
Bubbles (2006)
Champagnepigen (2006)
Krokodillerne (2006)
Hvordan vi slipper af med de andre (2007)
Det som ingen ved (2008)
Little Big Boy
Succubus, 2012 Danish horror short

References

External links
 Official Website
 
 Interview with Kim Sønderholm on (re)Search my Trash

1973 births
Living people
Danish male actors
Danish film directors
People from Aarhus
20th-century Danish male actors
21st-century Danish male actors